The Chinese warty newt (Paramesotriton chinensis) is a species of salamander in the family Salamandridae. 
It is found only in China, with a range extending from Chongqing to Hunan, Anhui, Zhejiang, Fujian, Guangdong, and Guangxi Provinces in Central China.
Its natural habitats are subtropical or tropical moist lowland forests, rivers, and freshwater marshes.
It is threatened by habitat loss.

References 

Paramesotriton
Endemic fauna of China
Amphibians of China
Taxonomy articles created by Polbot
Amphibians described in 1859
Taxa named by John Edward Gray